Paranchus albipes is a species of ground beetles in the family Carabidae.

Distribution
The species live near water in countries like: U.K, and continents like Europe, Asia, and North Africa.

References

Beetles described in 1796
Platyninae